Salmacis bicolor is a species of sea urchin in the Temnopleuroida family Temnopleuridae found in the western Indian Ocean and the Red Sea. the name derives from Salmacis (Ancient Greek: 'Σαλμακίς'), a nymph of Greek mythology, and latin 'bicolor' (two-coloured).

References

Temnopleuroida